Lauren Harris (born 6 July 1984) is a British rock singer and classically trained actress. She is the daughter of Steve Harris, the bassist of Iron Maiden, and Lorraine Harris. After completing her primary and secondary education at  Saint Nicholas School, Old Harlow, Essex, Harris attended Leventhorpe School, Sawbridgeworth, Hertfordshire, where she obtained her A-Levels, including Theatre Studies.

Harris began her music career singing in pubs in 2005, and went on to record demo material for Russ Ballard, before touring with Iron Maiden and releasing her debut album, Calm Before The Storm, in 2008. From 2010, Harris toured with her new hard rock band, Six Hour Sundown, performing at venues in the UK as well as the European Graspop, Download, and Sonisphere festivals. She frequently performs barefoot. Harris commenced a new musical project, Kingdom of I, working with songwriter Dave Stewart and drummer Shauney Recke.

Harris is a graduate of the London Academy of Music and Dramatic Art and the Oxford School of Drama and has appeared in numerous stage productions, highlighting with a London production as the role of Blanche Dubois in Streetcar Named Desire. Harris has appeared in the feature film Adrift in Soho.

Career

Music
Harris began singing in pubs and bars with a friend; after one of the performances, she was invited to Russ Ballard's house and studio to record a demo.

From 2005 to 2008, Harris worked with Grammy-nominated songwriter and producer Tom McWilliams, who assisted with song arrangement and composition.  McWilliams also toured with Harris, performing as the band's drummer.

Harris toured Europe, playing outdoor festivals such as the German Rock Am Ring, Rock Am Park and UK Download festivals.

Harris supported Iron Maiden on their A Matter of Life and Death world tour, playing at Dubai and the Brixton Academy, London, amongst other venues. When the tour concluded, Harris released her debut album entitled Calm Before the Storm, mixed by Kevin Shirley.  She continued to tour the UK and Europe in support of the release.  Harris joined Iron Maiden again, this time on the Somewhere Back In Time World tour.

In addition to supporting Iron Maiden, between 2006 and 2009 the Lauren Harris Band toured as a support act with bands such as Alice Cooper, Within Temptation, and Mötley Crüe.

In 2008 Harris named musical influences including Belinda Carlisle, Shakespears Sister, Alanis Morissette, Heart, Def Leppard and the Foo Fighters.

From 2010, following lineup changes, the Lauren Harris Band began touring under the new name "Six Hour Sundown". The band recorded new tracks at Compass Point Studios in the Bahamas but only Jekyll & Hyde saw commercial release, becoming available as a single for Download in 2011. The band played numerous festivals before deciding to part ways in late 2012.

In 2013, Harris moved to Los Angeles to commence work on a new musical project, Kingdom of I, with songwriter and producer Dave Stewart and drummer Shauney Recke. The debut track Crying at the Disco was released as a free download on Soundcloud in late 2013.

A Spotify playlist posted to the official Kingdom of I Facebook, intended to give a flavour for the type of music to expect on the album, cited musical influences such as Flyleaf, Muse, Paramore, Stone Sour, Annie Lennox and Stevie Nicks.

Acting
While in Los Angeles to work on Kingdom of I, Harris undertook classes in acting at Howard Fine Studios. She continued her training by completing a semester in classical acting at the London Academy of Music and Dramatic Art in 2014. In September 2016, Harris graduated from a one-year postgraduate course in acting at the Oxford School of Drama.

Between 2013 and 2015, Harris completed work in principal photography for the feature film, Adrift In Soho, which was released in 2018.

In September 2013, Harris was named as one of Variety Magazine'''s "10 Brits To Watch".

Harris has appeared in numerous stage productions, including A Streetcar Named Desire at London's Pack and Carriage and Measure For Measure at Oxford's North Wall, which received favourable reviews. In November 2016, she appeared in the role of Beth Armstrong for the BBC Radio 4 play Michael and Boris: The Two Brexiteers.

Harris' musical experience has influenced her acting career, with her recording an original song for a commercial for the technology company Eizo, and her role as the Witch in a production of the musical Into The Woods at the Oxford School of Drama.

In November 2016, Harris appeared in the role of sound technician in the music video for Bring Me the Horizon’s single "Oh No". Harris’ other work includes Global commercial roles for the companies  Eizo Global, Active Digital, and Coms Plc.

Line-up
Solo
Lauren Harris – vocals (2005–2010)
Randy Gregg – bass guitar, backing vocals (2005–2010)
Richie Faulkner – guitars, backing vocals (2005–2010)
Tommy McWilliams – drums (2005–2008)
Olly Smith – drums (2008–2010)

Six Hour Sundown
Lauren Harris – vocals (2010–2012)
Olly Smith – drums (2010–2012)
Tommy Gentry – guitars (2010–2012)
James Bennet – guitars (2010–2012)
Mitch Witham – bass (2010–2012)

Kingdom of I
Lauren Harris – vocals (2013)
Shauney Recke – drums (2013)

Discography
Lauren Harris BandCalm Before the Storm (2008)Your Turn (2009)

Six Hour SundownJekyll and Hyde (2011)

Kingdom of ICrying at the Disco'' (2013)

Filmography

Film

Stage

Radio

Music Videos

References

External links
 Lauren Harris Official Facebook
 Lauren Harris Twitter
 Interview with Lauren Harris by FREE! Magazine
 Kingdom of I: Inspiration
 Take Aim: Amy Sciaretto vs. Kingdom of I's Lauren Harris
 Sonic Cathedral Webzine - Lauren Harris Interview
 BW&BK Interview: LAUREN HARRIS – The Maiden, The Priest, And A SIX HOUR SUNDOWN

English actresses
English women singers
Living people
Women heavy metal singers
Iron Maiden (band)
1984 births
British hard rock musicians